William Henry Ravenscroft, CMG (11 January 1843 – 29 May 1890) was the 18th Auditor General and Accountant General and Controller of Revenue of Ceylon.

He was born the son of Henry William Ravenscroft of London. He served in the Commissariat Department of the Army from 1861 to 1874 and as Auditor-General for Griqualand West in 1876.

He was appointed Auditor General of Ceylon on 23 May 1877, succeeding C. A. D. Barclay, and held the office until his death in 1890, when he was succeeded by G. T. M. O'Brien.

He died in Ceylon in 1890. He had married Edith Elizabeth Fox and had 2 sons and a daughter.

References

1843 births
1890 deaths
Civil servants from London
British colonial governors and administrators in Africa
British colonial governors and administrators in Asia
Auditors General of Sri Lanka
Companions of the Order of St Michael and St George